Eriocaulon bolei is a critically endangered monocotyledonous plant only recorded in Satara district in the state of Maharashtra, India. It is a herb which grows up to 10–20 cm in height and seen in running water.

References

bolei
Flora of Maharashtra
Endemic flora of India (region)